Louisiana Creole cuisine is a style of cooking originating in Louisiana, United States, which blends West African, French, Spanish, and Amerindian influences, as well as influences from the general cuisine of the Southern United States.

Creole cuisine revolves around influences found in Louisiana from populations present there before its sale to the United States in the Louisiana Purchase of 1803.

The term Creole describes the population of people in French colonial Louisiana which consisted of the descendants of the French and Spanish, and over the years the term grew to include Acadians, Germans, Caribbeans, native-born slaves of African descent as well as those of mixed racial ancestry.

Creole food is a blend of the various cultures that found their way to Louisiana including French, Spanish, Acadian, Caribbean, West African, German and Native American, among others.

History

The Picayune Creole Cook Book has been described as "an authentic and complete account of the Creole kitchen". It was published in 1900 during a time when former slaves and their descendants were moving North. Local newspapers warned that when the last of the "race of Creole cooks" left New Orleans "the secrets of the Louisiana Kitchen" would be lost.

The recipes published in the cookbook were compiled by an unknown staffer at the Daily Picayune, who said the recipes came directly from "the old Creole 'mammies'". Since its initial publication it has been released in 16 subsequent editions with few alterations to the original recipes.

Both Creole and Cajun cuisine draw from French cooking traditions adapted to Louisiana's resources and influences; however, Creole cuisine is stereotypically considered more "city food" while Cajun cuisine is considered simpler "country food."

Classic Creole dishes

Appetizers

 Oysters Bienville
 Oysters en brochette
 Oysters Rockefeller
 Shrimp remoulade

Soups

 Bisque
 Gumbo
 Turtle soup

Main dishes
 Chicken Creole
 Creole Chicken Fricassée
 Creole baked chicken
 Crawfish étouffée
 Grillades
 Jambalaya
 Mirliton
 Pompano en papillote
 Red beans and rice
 Rice and gravy
 Shrimp bisque
 Shrimp creole
 Smothered pork chops
 Trout a la meunière

Side dishes
 Red beans
 Dirty rice
 Smothered green beans with sausage and potatoes

Desserts
Sugar first arrived in Louisiana from Santo Domingo in the mid-1700s. Sugarcane could be chewed plain, and it was not until 1795 that Etienne de Bore mastered the process of crystallizing sugar at his plantation (present day Audubon Park) in New Orleans.

Sugar began to replace cotton as the local cash crop and by 1840 the state was home to over 1,500 sugar mills and by 1860 over 300,000 slaves worked in various aspects of sugar production. Slave labor was needed not only in the fields, but also supported agricultural activities in other skilled roles like carpentry and metalworking. Louisiana accounted for around 90% of all national sugar production in the antebellum era.

One of the tradition southern desserts of the antebellum era was Sally Lunn bread. Made with butter and eggs, the bread had a texture similar to cake. During the Civil War, when some staple ingredients were unavailable, southern cooks substituted cornflour, rice flour or potatoes for wheat flour, and honey for sugar.

Creole cuisine is known for desserts like king cake, praline, and sweet dough pie. Regional desserts feature local fruits and nuts, such as berries, figs and pecans. In the early 20th century cane syrup became a staple ingredient, and is used in recipes for pecan pie, gingerbread, spice cookies, and gateau de sirop, or served plain with pancakes or hot buttermilk biscuits, similar to maple syrup in the cuisine of New England.

 Bananas Foster
 Beignets
 Doberge cake
 Banana pudding
 Bread pudding

Beverages
 Café Brûlot
 Café au lait
 Chicory coffee
 Ramos gin fizz
 Sazerac cocktail
 Vieux Carré
 Brandy milk punch

Breakfast
 Calas
 Eggs Sardou
 Grits and grillades
 French toast (or "lost bread")
 Beignet

Condiments
 Creole cream cheese
 Pepper jelly
 Remoulade
 Creole mustard
 Blue Plate Mayonnaise

Creole cooking methods
Barbecuing—similar to "slow and low" Southern barbecue traditions, but with Creole seasoning.
Baking—direct and indirect dry heat in a furnace or oven, faster than smoking but slower than grilling.
Grilling—direct heat on a shallow surface, fastest of all variants; sub-variants include:
Charbroiling—direct dry heat on a solid surface with wide raised ridges.
Gridironing—direct dry heat on a solid or hollow surface with narrow raised ridges.
Griddling—direct dry or moist heat along with the use of oils and butter on a flat surface.
Braising—combining a direct dry-heat charbroil grill or gridiron grill with a pot filled with broth for direct moist heat, faster than smoking but slower than regular grilling and baking; time starts fast, slows down, then speeds up again to finish.
Boiling—as in boiling of crabs, crawfish, or shrimp, in seasoned liquid.
Deep frying
Smothering—cooking a vegetable or meat with low heat and small amounts of water or stock, similar to braising. Étouffée is a popular variant done with crawfish or shrimp.
Pan-broiling or pan-frying.
Injecting—using a large syringe-type setup to place seasoning deep inside large cuts of meat. This technique is much newer than the others on this list, but very common in Creole cooking.

Deep-frying of turkeys or oven-roasted turduckens entered southern Louisiana cuisine more recently.

Ingredients
The following is a partial list of ingredients used in Creole cuisine and some of the staple ingredients.

Grains
Corn
Rice—long, medium, or short grain white
Rice proved to be a valuable commodity in Creole cuisine. With an abundance of water and a hot, humid climate, rice could be grown practically anywhere in the region and grew wild in some areas. Rice became the predominant starch in the diet, as it was easy to grow, store and prepare. The oldest rice mill in operation in the United States, the Conrad Rice Mill, is located in New Iberia. Recently, LSU has released two types of "high-yielding, conventional" rice from their agricultural center.
Wheat (for baking bread)

Fruits and vegetables

Bell peppers
Blackberries
Cayenne peppers
Celery
Collard greens
Cucumbers
Figs
Limes
Lemons
Mirlitons (also called chayotes or vegetable pears)
Muscadines
Okra
Onions
Satsuma oranges
Scallions (also known as green onions or onion tops)
Squash
Strawberries
Sweet potatoes
Tabasco pepper
Tomatoes

Meat and seafood
Creole folkways include many techniques for preserving meat, some of which are waning due to the availability of refrigeration and mass-produced meat at the grocer. Smoking of meats remains a fairly common practice, but once-common preparations such as turkey or duck confit (preserved in poultry fat, with spices) are now seen even by Acadians as quaint rarities.

Game is still uniformly popular in Creole cooking.

The recent increase of catfish farming in the Mississippi Delta has increased its usage in Creole cuisine, replacing the more traditional wild-caught trout (the saltwater species) and red fish.
Seafood
Freshwater 
Bass—commonly known as green trout in south Louisiana
Catfish
Sac-au-Lait—white perch or crappie
Yellow perch
Saltwater or brackish water species
Trout
Redfish
Pompano
Drumfish
Flounder
Grouper
Perch—many varieties
Snapper—many varieties
Shellfish
Crawfish – either wild swamp or farm-raised
Oysters
Blue Crab
Also included in the seafood mix are some so-called trash fish that would not sell at market because of their high bone to meat ratio or required complicated cooking methods. These were brought home by fishermen to feed the family. Examples are garfish, black drum also called  or just goo, croaker, and bream.

Poultry
Farm Raised
Turkey (and turkey confit)
Chicken (and Guinea hen)
Game birds
Dove
Goose
Quail
Duck (and duck confit)Pork
Andouille—a spicy dry-smoked sausage, characterized by a coarse-ground texture
—similar to the Spanish chorizo
Ham hocks
Wild boar or feral hog
Head cheese
Pork sausage (fresh)—not smoked or cured, but highly seasoned. Mostly used in gumbos. The sausage itself does not include rice, separating it from boudin.
Salt pork
Cracklin' - tender pork rinds
Chicharron - Boiled skin which breaks the cells of collagen. Fat is scraped off and pieces are dehydrated. Deep fried for a "puffy" consistency.
Gratons - Skin on pork belly, cured similarly to bacon for up to a week, cooked in its own fat and dehydrated. Deep fried until tender.

Beef and dairy
Though parts of the Louisiana where Creole cooking is found are well suited to cattle or dairy farming, beef is not often used in a pre-processed or uniquely Creole form. It is usually prepared fairly simply as chops, stews, or steaks, taking a cue from Texas to the west. Ground beef is used as is traditional throughout the southern US, although seasoned differently.

Dairy farming is not as prevalent as in the past, but there are still some farms in the business. There are unique dairy items produced in Creole cooking such as Creole cream cheese.

Other game meats
Alligator
Alligator gar, or gator gar
Frog, usually bullfrogs (not just the legs, but the entire creature)
Gros bec—commonly called night heron
Nutria
Squirrel
Rabbit
Skunk, or mouffette
Turtle
Snake
Virginia opossum, or sarigue

Creole seasonings
Individual

Bay leaf
Oregano
Bell peppers (green or red)
Black pepper
Cayenne pepper
Celery
Garlic
Onion—bell pepper, onion, and celery used together are known as the "holy trinity" of Creole cuisine.
Parsley, flat leaf
Sassafras leaves—dried and ground into the spice known as filé for gumbo of the Choctaw
Dried shrimp
Sugarcane, also cane syrup, brown sugar and molasses
Thyme

Blended
"Creole spice" blends such as Tony Chachere's and REX King of Spice are sometimes used in Creole kitchens, but do not suit every cook's style because Creole-style seasoning is often achieved from scratch, even by taste. 
Whole peppers are almost never used in authentic Creole dishes—ground cayenne, paprika, and pepper sauces predominate.
Hot sauce
Seafood boil mix
Vinegar seasoned with small, pickled, hot green peppers is a common condiment with many Creole meals.
Persillade
Marinades made with olive oil, brown sugar, and citrus juices
Various barbecue rubs similar to those in other states

Cooking bases

Knowing how to make a good roux is key to Cajun and Creole cooking. The technique was inherited from the French. A roux is "a mixture made from equal parts of fat and flour, used especially to make a sauce or soup thicker." The fat and flour are cooked together on the stovetop until the mixture reaches a certain level of brownness, or darkness.

Creole roux in New Orleans are known to be lighter than Cajun roux and are usually made with butter or bacon fat and flour. But certain Creole dishes use a dark roux.

Dark roux are usually made with oil or bacon fat and flour. The scent of a good roux is so strong that it stays in clothes until they are washed. The scent is so widely recognized in Louisiana that others can tell if someone is making a roux, and often infer that they're making a gumbo.

The secret to making a good gumbo is pairing the roux with the protein, similar to pairing the right wine and protein.

Light roux: A light roux is well-suited for seafood dishes, because the roux will not overwhelm the subtle seafood flavors. A light-colored roux does not support the heavier meat flavor of meat-based gumbos. For a light roux, the flour is cooked to a light golden brown. 
Medium roux: Medium roux are the most versatile and probably the most common among the Creole cuisine of the New Orleans area. They work well with most Creole dishes. A medium roux will turn the color of a copper penny or peanut butter. A medium roux begins to take on the warm, browned flavor widely associated with gumbo. 
Dark roux: A dark roux, with its strong (dense) nutty flavor will completely overpower a simple seafood gumbo, but is the perfect complement to a gumbo using chicken, sausage, crawfish or alligator.  Chicken will just settle into the darker flavor, while sausage and dark roux balance each other well. A dark roux is approximately the color of milk chocolate.
Preparing a dark roux is complicated. It involves heating oil or fat and flour very carefully, constantly stirring for 15–45 minutes (depending on the darkness desired), until the mixture has turned quite dark and developed a rich, nutty flavor and smell. It's very easy to burn the flour as it moves toward a darker brown, and burnt roux renders a dish unpalatable. A heavy-bottomed pot can help protect the roux from burning. 
Stocks: Creole stocks may be more heavily seasoned than Continental counterparts, and the shellfish stock sometimes made with shrimp and crawfish heads is unique to Creole cuisine.
Fish stock and Court-bouillon
Shellfish stock
Chicken stock

Creole dishes

Primary favorites

Gumbo—Gumbo is the quintessential stew-like soup of Louisiana. The dish is a Louisiana version of West African okra soups which the dish gumbo is named for. The name gumbo is derived from the French term for okra, which entered Louisiana French from West African languages as gombo, from the West African kilogombo or quingombo.

Okra, often one of the principal ingredients in gumbo recipes, is used as a thickening agent and for its distinct flavor. In modern Louisiana cuisine, okra is not a requirement any longer, so gumbos can be made either with or without okra. Often gumbo that is not made with okra is made with a Louisiana spice called filé, made from ground sassafras leaves. Chicken gumbos are often made without okra and made with filé instead.

Tradition holds that a seafood gumbo is more common in summer months when okra is plentiful and a chicken or wild game gumbo in winter months when hunting is common. However, in modern times a variety of gumbo types have become commonplace year-round in Louisiana.

A filé gumbo is thickened with dried sassafras leaves after the stew has finished cooking, a practice borrowed from the Choctaw Indians. The backbone of a gumbo is roux of which there are two variations mainly used. A medium roux, or a dark roux, which is made of flour, toasted in fat or oil until well-browned.

Jambalaya—The only certain thing that can be said about a jambalaya is that it contains rice, some sort of meat (such as chicken or beef) or seafood (such as shrimp or crawfish) and almost anything else. Usually, however, one will find green peppers, onions, celery, tomatoes and hot chili peppers. Anything else is optional.

The dish evolved, going through a creolization of Louisiana influences. Jambalaya is a highly seasoned rice casserole.

Shrimp Creole—Shrimp Creole is a favorite of Creole cuisine in the greater New Orleans area. It's a dish made of shrimp, tomatoes, onion, bell pepper, celery, garlic and cayenne pepper. Classic shrimp creole does not contain a roux, but some cooks may add one. It's an early Creole dish that shows its strong French and Spanish heritage.

Red beans and rice—Red beans and rice is one of the most common dishes found in New Orleans, cooked in homes and restaurants throughout the New Orleans area. Red beans arrived with white French Creoles from Haiti who escaped Haiti during the slave uprising, settling in New Orleans. The wonderful stew of red beans has a strong Caribbean influence.

Rice and gravy—Rice and gravy dishes are a staple of Creole cuisine  and are usually a brown gravy based on pan drippings, which are deglazed and simmered with extra seasonings and served over steamed or boiled rice. The dish is traditionally made from cheaper cuts of meat and cooked in a cast-iron pot, typically for an extended time period in order to let the tough cuts of meat become tender. Beef, pork, chicken or any of a large variety of game meats are used for its preparation. Popular local varieties include hamburger steak, smothered rabbit, turkey necks, and chicken fricassee.

Primary desserts 
Bread pudding—dessert made from day-old or stale French bread. It is a popular Creole and Cajun dessert that also contains eggs, milk, cinnamon, and vanilla.

Food as an event

Crawfish boil

The crawfish boil is a celebratory event that involves boiling crawfish, potatoes, onions and corn in large pots over propane cookers. Although potatoes, onions and corn are the most popular of the boil sides, many boils include peppers, mushrooms, celery, ravioli, whole garlic cloves and sweet potatoes. The crawfish boil is an event central to both Creole and Cajun cuisines.

Lemons and small muslin bags containing a mixture of bay leaves, mustard seeds, cayenne pepper and other spices, commonly known as "crab boil" or "crawfish boil" are added to the water for seasoning. The results are then dumped onto large, newspaper-draped tables and in some areas covered in Creole spice blends, such as REX, Zatarain's, Louisiana Fish Fry or Tony Chachere's.

Also, cocktail sauce, mayonnaise and hot sauce are sometimes used. The seafood is scooped onto large trays or plates and eaten by hand. During times when crawfish are not abundant, shrimp and crabs are prepared and served in the same manner.

Attendees are encouraged to "suck the head" of a crawfish by separating the abdomen of the crustacean and sucking out the abdominal fat/juices.

Often, newcomers to the crawfish boil, or those unfamiliar with the traditions, are jokingly warned "not to eat the dead ones". This comes from the common belief that when live crawfish are boiled, their tails curl beneath themselves, but when dead crawfish are boiled, their tails are straight and limp.
Seafood boils with crabs and shrimp are also popular.

See also

 Barbecue
 Cajun cuisine
 Cuisine of New Orleans
 Cuisine of the Southern United States

New Orleans Creole Restaurants

 Antoine's
 Arnaud's
 Brennan's
 Broussard's
 Commander's Palace
 Galatoire's
 Hubig's New Orleans Style Pies
 Dooky Chase's

Notable Creole cooks and chefs 

 Leah Chase
 Nellie Murray
 Paul Prudhomme

References

External links
 Offers both Creole and Cajun Food shipped nationwide Cajun & Creole Food can be found here at Cajun.com.
 The full text and page images of Célestine Eustis's Cooking in Old Creole Days can be found here at Feeding America: The Historic American Cookbook Project.
 https://www.ricefarming.com/departments/feature/two-additions/

 
 
American cuisine by ethnic group